Nigoghos Sarafian (1902 in Varna, Principality of Bulgaria - 1972 in Paris, France), was an Armenian writer, poet, editor, and journalist.

Biography 
Nigoghos Sarafian was born on a boat that was leaving Constantinople on the way to Varna. He received his education in Armenian and French schools in Romania and Bulgaria. During the troublesome period of World War I, Sarafian along with his family fled back to Varna where they would remain until the Armistice of Mudros and move to Istanbul. He attended the prestigious  Getronagan Armenian High School. After the promulgation of the Turkish Republic in 1923 he moved to Paris. He wrote prolifically in French and Armenian.

Bibliography
 The Conquest of a Space, Paris, 1928
 14, Paris, 1933
 Ebb and Flow, Paris, 1939
 The Princess (novel), Paris, 1934, 108 pages
 Citadel (1940–1946), Paris, 1946, 198 pages
 Mediterranean, Beirut, 1971, 39 pages
 The Pain of Light, Paris-Antelias, 2000, 191 pages

References 

Armenian-language writers
European writers in French
Armenians from the Ottoman Empire
Writers from Istanbul
Writers from Varna, Bulgaria
Bulgarian people of Armenian descent
1905 births
1973 deaths
Bulgarian male writers
Turkish emigrants to France